Lobelia nicotianifolia is a species of flowering plant with a distribution  primarily across India and Sri Lanka. It is commonly called wild tobacco, because the leaves resemble tobacco leaves. It is a poisonous plant.

Flowering
December.

Medicinal uses
Lobelia nicotianifolia is used in India to treat bronchitis, asthma, and insect and scorpion bites and to induce nausea and vomiting

Common names
English: Wild tobacco
Hindi: धवल Dhawal, नरसल Narasala
Marathi: Dhawal, रान तंबाखू Ran tambakhu
Tamil: Upperichedi, காட்டுப்புகையிலை Kattu-p-pukaiyilai
Malayalam: Kattupokala, കാട് പുകയില Kaat Pukayila
Telugu: అడవి పొగాకు Adavipogaku
Kannada: ಕಾಡು ಹೊಗೆಸೊಪ್ಪು Kadahogesoppu, ಕಾಡು ತಮ್ಬಾಕು Kaadu Tambaaku
Bengali: Badanala
Gujarati: નળી Nali
Sinhala: Wal dunkola
Konkani: बकनल Baknal
Sanskrit: म्रित्युपुष्प Mrityupushpa, म्रदुछड़ Mriduchhada, महानाला Mahanala, सुराद्रुम Suradruma
Bengali: নাল Nala, বাদানাল Badanala
Mizo: Berawchal

References

http://www.flowersofindia.net/catalog/slides/Wild%20Tobacco.html
http://indiabiodiversity.org/species/show/230301
http://www.theplantlist.org/tpl/record/kew-353650
http://dh-web.org/place.names/bot2sinhala.html#L
http://www.indianaturewatch.net/displayimage.php?id=299787

nicotianifolia
Flora of China
Flora of tropical Asia